Entradero del Castillo is a corregimiento in Herrera Province in the Republic of Panama.

References 

Populated places in Herrera Province